Beli ap Rhun (c. 517 – c. 599) was King of Gwynedd (reigned c. 586 – c. 599). Nothing is known of the person, and his name is known only from Welsh genealogies, which confirm that he had at least two sons. He succeeded his father Rhun ap Maelgwn as king, and was in turn succeeded by his son Iago. Beli was either the father or grandfather of Saint Edeyrn.

The royal genealogies of the Harleian genealogies, Jesus College MS. 20, and Hengwrt MS. 202 show him as the ancestor and descendant of kings, and thus presumably a king himself. The Bonedd y Saint says that he is the ancestor of Saint Edeyrn (the Bonedd y Saint says that he was the son of Nudd or Lludd who was the son of Beli, while Hengwrt MS. 202 says that he was the son of Beli).

One of the medieval Welsh Triads mentions a certain 'Rhun ap Beli', implying that there was yet another son of Beli, who was famed for his military exploits. The name is repeated elsewhere in medieval poetry, such as in Hywel Foel's (fl. c. 1240 – 1300) awdl lamenting the capture and imprisonment of Owain ap Gruffudd, where he likens Owain to Rhun: "Who if free, like Rhun the son of Beli, Would not let Lloegria burn his borders". There is no confirming evidence that such a person existed, and it is contradicted by records such as the royal genealogies. Scholars such as Thomas Stephens have concluded that this is a mistake, and that the intended person was someone else.

See also
Kings of Wales family trees

Citations

References 

517 births
599 deaths
Monarchs of Gwynedd
6th-century Welsh monarchs